Oliver Benjamin Gerbig (Chinese: 周緣德; pinyin: Zhōu Yuándé; born 12 December 1998) is a Hong Kong professional footballer of partial German descent who currently plays as a centre back for Hong Kong Premier League club Kitchee.

Gerbig has played for Hong Kong U-20, Royal Blues and Taipei Red Lions in the Taiwan Football Premier League. In 2018, he began playing NCAA Division I Men's Soccer at Coastal Carolina University in the United States. Since 2020, he has transferred to the University of Virginia.

Amateur career 
In April 2015, Gerbig began playing for Royal Blues in Taipei at the age of 16. In his debut match, a league match against Taichung City on 1 November 2015, he was substituted in at 41 minutes, and 4 minutes later, he scored his first goal with a long shot. This goal contributed to Royal Blues winning the game 3–1.

In April 2018, Gerbig joined the Taipei Red Lions, but he suffered a knee injury during this time. Not only did he leave the team after only three months of playing for the Taipei Red Lions, but he also missed the 2018 Asian Games.

In July 2018, Gerbig went to the United States to study at Coastal Carolina University and represented the Coastal Carolina Men's Soccer Team in NCAA Division I Men's Soccer. In two years, he appeared in 35 matches as the main centre back. In the second year, he helped the team win the 2019 Sun Belt Conference and qualified for the NCAA Division I Men's Soccer Tournament.

On 29 February 2020, Gerbig announced his transfer to the University of Virginia on the social media, where he would represent Virginia Cavaliers Men's Soccer. University of Virginia is a top school for the NCAA Men's Soccer Division I program in the United States. The team has qualified for the NCAA Division I Men's Soccer Tournament over 40 times and won 7 championships. It also finished as runner-up in 2019.

Professional career

Kitchee
On 24 July 2022, Kitchee announced an agreement for Gerbig to join in the 2022–23 season.

On 19 August 2022, Gerbig made his professional debut in the AFC Champions League Round of 16 match against BG Pathum United.

International career 
Gerbig represented Hong Kong U-20 in the 13th National Games of the People’s Republic of China in 2017. In the 2018 Asian Games the following year, although Gerbig was once again selected for the 40-man roster of Hong Kong U-23, he had to sit out on the Asian Games due to injury.

Gerbig was called up again in the 2020 AFC U23 Championship qualifiers and played for the first time against North Korea U-23, where Hong Kong U-23 lost by two goals in the final match.

Personal life 
Gerbig was born and raised in Hong Kong. He attended the Discovery Bay International School, where he began playing football. He moved to Taiwan at the age of 5.

After moving to Taiwan, Gerbig attended Taipei European School. He transferred to Taipei American School two years later, where he graduated high school in 2018.

References

External links
 

1998 births
Living people
Hong Kong footballers
Hong Kong people of German descent
Association football defenders
Taiwan Football Premier League players
Hong Kong Premier League players
Kitchee SC players
Expatriate soccer players in the United States
Virginia Cavaliers men's soccer players
Coastal Carolina Chanticleers men's soccer players
Hong Kong expatriate footballers
Hong Kong expatriates in the United States